Horace Hammerton Harned, Jr. (July 27, 1920 – July 2, 2017) was an American politician in the state of Mississippi. He served in the Mississippi House of Representatives and Mississippi State Senate as a Democrat. He was one of seven legislators who sat on the Mississippi State Sovereignty Commission in the 1960s. He served in the Senate from 1952 to 1956, and in the House from 1960 to 1980.

References

1920 births
2017 deaths
People from Starkville, Mississippi
Democratic Party Mississippi state senators
Democratic Party members of the Mississippi House of Representatives